Pawłowo may refer to the following places:

Toponymy

In Masovian voivodeship 
Pawłowo, Ciechanów County (east-central Poland)
Pawłowo, Mława County (east-central Poland)
Pawłowo, Płońsk County (east-central Poland)
Pawłowo, Pułtusk County (east-central Poland)
Pawłowo, Sierpc County (east-central Poland)

In Greater Poland Voivodeship 
Pawłowo, Gniezno County (west-central Poland)
Pawłowo, Rawicz County (west-central Poland)

In Pomeranian Voivodeship 
Pawłowo, Chojnice County (north Poland)
Pawłowo, Gdańsk County (north Poland)
Pawłowo, Kwidzyn County (north Poland)
Pawłowo, Sztum County (north Poland)

In Warmian-Masurian Voivodeship 
Pawłowo, Olsztyn County (north Poland)
Pawłowo, Węgorzewo County (north Poland)